Upper Hunter is an electoral district of the Legislative Assembly in the Australian state of New South Wales. The seat is currently held by Dave Layzell for the National Party after he was elected at a by-election to replace Michael Johnsen.

Upper Hunter covers the entirety of Dungog Shire, Muswellbrook Shire, Upper Hunter Shire, Liverpool Plains Shire (excluding the area around Werris Creek), the northern half of Singleton Shire (including Singleton itself), northeastern Mid-Western Regional Council (including Bylong) and part of Mid-Coast Council.

History

In 1859, Upper Hunter replaced the Electoral district of Phillip, Brisbane and Bligh, established in the first Parliament in 1856. It had two members from 1880 to 1894. It was abolished in 1894 and largely replaced by Robertson and Singleton. In 1904 Robertson was abolished and Upper Hunter was recreated. It was abolished from 1920 with the introduction of proportional representation, but was recreated in 1927.

Upper Hunter is one of three electorates to have never been held by the Labor Party and always by the conservative side of politics since the abolition of proportional representation in 1927, the other two being Tamworth and Oxley. The Nationals have held the district without interruption since 1931.

Members for Upper Hunter

First incarnation 1856–1894

Second incarnation 1904–1920

Third incarnation 1927–present

Election results

References

Electoral districts of New South Wales
1859 establishments in Australia
Constituencies established in 1859
1894 disestablishments in Australia
Constituencies disestablished in 1894
1904 establishments in Australia
Constituencies established in 1904
1920 disestablishments in Australia
Constituencies disestablished in 1920
1927 establishments in Australia
Constituencies established in 1927
Dungog Shire
Mid-Coast Council
Muswellbrook Shire
Singleton Council
Upper Hunter Shire